Central Highlands Council is a local government body in Tasmania, encompassing the Central Highlands region of the state. Central Highlands is classified as a rural local government area and has a population of 2,144, the two largest towns are Bothwell and Hamilton.

History and attributes
Central Highlands was established on 2 April 1993 after the amalgamation of the Bothwell and Hamilton municipalities.

Central Highlands is the least densely populated local government area of Tasmania, with only 0.3 people per square kilometre. The municipality is classified as rural, agricultural and medium (RAM) under the Australian Classification of Local Governments.

Towns
The population of the area is small and quite decentralised, resulting in a large number of small towns. Some of these towns were founded as support sites for workers on the hydro-electric dams scattered along the upper Derwent River. Main towns are considered Hamilton (council headquarters) and Bothwell.

The towns (with population as of 2006):
 Bothwell (376)
 Bronte Park (16)
 Derwent Bridge (?)
 Hamilton (300)
 Liawenee (?)
 Miena (104)
 Ouse (137)
 Tarraleah

Townships
The municipality is subdivided into eight townships:
Hamilton Township
Ouse Township
Gretna Township
Ellendale Township
Fentonbury Township
Westerway Township
Wayatinah Township
Bothwell Township

Other localities
•	
•	
•	
•	
•	
•	
•	Central Plateau
•	
•	
•	
•	
•	
•	
•	
•	
•	
•	
•	Lake St Clair
•	
•	
•	
•	
•	
•	
•	
•	
•	
•	
•	
•	
•	
•	Southwest
•	
•	
•	
•	
•	Waddamana
•	Walls of Jerusalem
•

Parks and reserves
It covers most of the mountainous centre of the state, also known as the Central Plateau which contains the Central Plateau Conservation Area including sections of the Tasmanian Wilderness World Heritage Area, as well as the Cradle Mountain-Lake St Clair National Park, and Walls of Jerusalem National Park.  Other smaller reserves of different status occur in the region as well.

Government

See also
List of local government areas of Tasmania

References

Further reading
 Jetson, Tim.(1989) The roof of Tasmania: a history of the Central Plateau  Launceston, Tas.: Pelion Press.

External links
Central Highlands Council official website
Local Government Association Tasmania
Tasmanian Electoral Commission - local government

 
Local government areas of Tasmania
Central Highlands (Tasmania)